Salinópolis Airport  is the airport serving Salinópolis, Brazil.

Airlines and destinations

Access

See also

List of airports in Brazil

References

External links

Airports in Pará